The Ham class was a class of inshore minesweepers (IMS), known as the Type 1, of the British Royal Navy. The class was designed to operate in the shallow water of rivers and estuaries. All of the ships in the class are named for British place names that end with -"ham". The parent firm that was responsible for supervising construction was Samuel White of Cowes, Isle of Wight.

Unlike traditional minesweepers, they were not equipped for sweeping moored or magnetic mines. Their work was to locate individual mines and neutralise them. This was a then-new role, and the class was configured for working in the shallow water of rivers, estuaries and shipping channels.

The class consisted of 93 ships, launched between 1954 and 1959.  was the first. They were built in three slightly different sub-groups, the first sub-group, the 26-group, is distinguished by pennant numbers 26xx, and the second and third sub-groups, the 27-group, are distinguished by pennant numbers 27xx. The 26-group was of wood and non-ferrous metal composite construction and the 27-group was of all-wood construction. The third sub-group is distinguished by a prominent rubbing strake around the hull and slightly larger dimensions.

The vessels displaced  fully laden and were armed with one 40 mm Bofors or 20 mm Oerlikon gun. The construction was of wood to minimise the magnetic signature. The crew complement was 15, rising to 22 in wartime.

The engines of this class were Paxman diesels, some of which were built under licence by Ruston and Hornsby of Lincoln. Maximum speed was  dropping to  when mine sweeping.

Ships

  (IMS87)
  (IMS02)
  (IMS03)
  (IMS04)
  (IMS05)
  (IMS06)
  (IMS85)
  (IMS07)
  (IMS08)
  (IMS09)
  (IMS10)
  (IMS11)
  (IMS12) (later HMMS Temasek)
  (IMS13)
  (IMS14)
  (IMS15)
  (IMS16)
  (IMS17)
  (IMS18)
  (IMS19)
  (IMS31)
  (IMS21)
  (IMS22)
  (IMS23)
  (IMS24)
  (IMS25)
  (IMS26)
  (IMS27)
  (IMS28)
  (IMS29)
  (IMS30)
  (IMS54)
  (IMS20)
  (IMS32)
  (IMS88)
  (IMS33)
  (IMS34)
  (IMS35)
  (IMS36)
  (IMS37)
  (IMS42)
  (IMS39)
  (IMS01)
  (IMS40)
  (IMS41)
  (IMS38)
  (IMS43) (burnt to hull, London 2017)
  (IMS44)
  (IMS45)
  (IMS89)
  (IMS46)
  (IMS47)
  (IMS48)
  (IMS49)
  (IMS50)
  (IMS51)
  (IMS83)
  (IMS52)
  (IMS53)
  (IMS55)
  (IMS56)
  (IMS92)
  (IMS82)
  (IMS81)
  (IMS57) (later HMS Waterwitch)
  (IMS58)
  (IMS84)
  (IMS59)
  (IMS86)
  (IMS60)
  (IMS61)
  (IMS62)
  (IMS91)
  (IMS64)
  (IMS63)
  (IMS65)
  (IMS66) (beached and abandoned, Battersea London 2017)
  (IMS68)
  (IMS67)
  (IMS69)
  (IMS70)
  (IMS90)
  
  (IMS71)
  (IMS72)
  (IMS73)
  (IMS74)
  (IMS75)
  (IMS76)
  (IMS77)
  (IMS78)
  (IMS79)
  (IMS80) (later HMS Woodlark)

In 1964 Ten of the vessels were allocated to the Royal Naval Auxiliary Service

References

 Warships of the Royal Navy, Captain John. E. Moore RN, Jane's Publishing, 1979

 
Mine warfare vessel classes
Ship classes of the Royal Navy
Mine warfare vessels of the Yugoslav Navy